The 1991 Eurocard Classics was a men's ATP tennis tournament played on indoor carpet courts at the Hanns-Martin-Schleyer-Halle in Stuttgart, Germany that was part of the Championship Series of the 1991 ATP Tour. It was the second edition of the tournament and was held from 18 February until 24 February 1991. Second-seeded Stefan Edberg won the singles title.

Finals

Singles
 Stefan Edberg defeated  Jonas Svensson, 6–2, 3–6, 7–5, 6–2
 It was Edberg's 1st singles title of the year and 28th of his career.

Doubles
 Sergio Casal /  Emilio Sánchez defeated  Jeremy Bates /  Nick Brown, 6–3, 7–5

References

External links
 ITF tournament edition details

Eurocard Open
Eurocard Classics
Eurocard Classics